The 8.8 cm SK L/35 (SK - Schnelladekanone (quick loading cannon) L - Länge (with a 35-caliber barrel) was a German naval gun that was used in World War I on a variety of mounts.

Description
It used the Krupp horizontal sliding block, or "wedge", as it is sometimes referred to, breech design.

Naval service
The 8.8 cm SK L/35 was a widely used naval gun on many classes of World War I battleships, cruisers and torpedo boats in both casemates and turrets.  Its primary use on battleships and cruisers was as an anti-torpedo boat gun, while on torpedo boats it was their secondary armament.

Ship classes that carried the 8.8 cm SK L/35 include:

See also
 List of naval guns

Notes

References

External links
 SK L/35 at Navweaps.com

88 mm artillery
Naval guns of Germany